Gadepalli is the name of a village in Telangana, India. It is also a surname used by several families living in eastern Telangana and East Godavari districts.

Villages in Nizamabad district